Robert Moore may refer to:

Artists and writers
Robert Moore (director) (1927–1984), American stage, film and television director
Robert Moore Williams (1907–1977), science fiction writer
Robert Moore (poet), Canadian poet, actor, director, playwright, and professor
R. Stevie Moore (born 1952), American musician

Engineers, scientists and theorists
Robert Moore (Northern Ireland politician) (1886–1960), Northern Ireland theologian and politician
 Robert Moore (1838–1922) American civil engineer and president of the American Society of Civil Engineers (ASCE)
R. I. Moore (Robert Ian Moore, born 1941), medieval historian
Robert L. Moore (psychologist) (1942–2016), Jungian psychoanalyst and consultant, seminary professor
Robert Lee Moore (1882–1974), American mathematician
Robert Ross Rowan Moore (1811–1864), Irish political economist
Robert Y. Moore (born 1931), American neurologist and chronobiologist

Politicians
Robert Moore (Pennsylvania politician) (1778–1831), United States Congressman from Pennsylvania
Robert J. Moore (1844–?), Texas politician
Robert Lee Moore (Georgia politician) (1867–1940), American politician and lawyer from Georgia
Robert L. Moore (Arizona politician) (1874–1942), American politician from Arizona, Arizona State Senator
Robert M. Moore (1816–1880), American politician, mayor of Cincinnati, Ohio
Robert E. Moore (1849–1921), American politician; Lieutenant Governor of Nebraska, 1895–97
Robert S. Moore Jr. (born 1945), American politician in the Arkansas House of Representatives
Robbie Moore (MP) (born 1984), British politician, Conservative Member of Parliament for Keighley

Sports
Rob Moore (field hockey) (born 1981), British field hockey player
Robbie Moore (born 1954), Canadian ice hockey player
Robert Moore (1941–1993), English footballer better known as Bobby Moore
Robert Moore (American football) (born 1964), American former gridiron football safety 
Robert Moore (baseball) (born 2002), American baseball player
Robert Moore (English cricketer) (1812–1857), English cricketer
Robert Moore (cricketer) (1905–1945), Irish cricketer

Other
Robert Thomas Moore (1882–1958), American businessman, ornithologist and philanthropist
Robert H. Moore (1924–1978), Korean War flying ace
Robert de Grimston (born 1935), aka Moore, founder of The Process Church of The Final Judgment
Robert Moore (Oregon pioneer) (1781–1857), founder of Linn City, Oregon
Robert Moore (gambler) (c. 1953–1997), New Zealand horse bettor
Robert Moore, former Dodger Stadium chef and co-owner of the now-defunct Moore's Delicatessen
Robert Moore (priest) (fl. 1897–1947), Australian Anglican Archdeacon of Northam and Dean of Perth
Robert Scurlark Moore (1895–1978), U.S. Army major general and congressional liaison
Robert Waters Moore (1819–1884), surgeon and medical practitioner in the colony of South Australia

See also
Bob Moore (disambiguation)
Bobby Moore (disambiguation)
Rob Moore (disambiguation)
Robert Moor (1889–1972), French actor
Robert More (disambiguation)